Blue Reef is a national chain of public aquariums in England owned by Aspro Parks.

History
Blue Reef was formed as Newquay Leisure Limited in January 2000. to operate the Blue Reef Aquarium in the area. In July 2001, Blue Reef acquired the Sea Life Centres in Portsmouth and Tynemouth, and announced in November 2001 to refurbish them under the Blue Reef name for 2002 openings.

In November 2007, Blue Reef announced they had acquired the Hastings-based attraction Underwater World from Hastings Heritage and would refurbish it as a Blue Reef Aquarium in time for 2008. On the same day, they also announced that they would also begin to operate Smugglers Adventure attraction nearby.

On 7 April 2008, Aspro Parks announced the purchase of Blue Reef Leisure for an undisclosed amount. The purchase was for Aspro to expand their UK offerings. On the same day, it was announced that Blue Reef would open a branch at At-Bristol in Bristol for 2009 at the former Wildwalk and IMAX Cinema sites under a 65-year lease.

Current Venues

Newquay

The Newquay branch is located in Newquay, England. This is the original branch that formed as part of the chain.

It is home to over 40 living displays from tropical sharks and lobsters to seahorses and tropical fish. At the Aquarium’s heart is a large ocean tank where an underwater walkthrough tunnel offers close encounters with the tropical coral reef fish. Other displays are home to giant Pacific octopus, triggerfish, nautilus, cuttlefish, turtles and terrapins.

In 2008 the aquarium opened "Tropical Shark Lagoon". Themed as a mangrove lagoon, the display is home to a variety of tropical shark and ray species. The display allows for close-up views both above and below the waterline of stingrays, zebra sharks, blue spotted rays and exotic fish. The display is also home to a variety of juvenile species which use the mangrove as a nursery before moving on to the open ocean.

In 2009, a four-foot polychaete worm nicknamed Barry, was eventually captured after months of trap laying. The polychaete worm had been damaging the coral reefs in a tank in the aquarium, in some cases ripping the coral in half. It also injured a Tang fish . As contact with the venomous bristles at the mouth of the worm can cause permanent numbness, the worm was moved into its own tank.

Portsmouth

The Portsmouth branch is located in Clarence Esplanade, Southsea, Portsmouth, England, which opened on 25 March 2002.
Formerly home to the Southsea Sea Life Aquarium.

The aquarium is home to over 40 living displays are home to various species including tropical sharks, lobsters, seahorses, and tropical fish.  There is a large ocean tank where an underwater walkthrough tunnel offers close encounters with reef fish.

In 2007 the aquarium opened the Blue Reef Beach Club, a new outdoor activity area incorporating a wet play zone for children with fountains and giant showers.

Former
These locations remain under Aspro Parks ownership but are now branded under more generic names.

Tynemouth

The Tynemouth branch is located in Tynemouth, England, which opened on February 9, 2002. It was formerly home to the Tynemouth Sea Life Aquarium.

It is home to over 40 living displays, from tropical sharks and lobsters to seahorses and tropical fish. At the Aquarium’s heart is a large ocean tank where an underwater walkthrough tunnel offers close encounters with the tropical coral reef fish. Other displays are home to poison dart frogs, nautilus, toxic toads, turtles, terrapins, and otters.

In Easter 2007, the aquarium opened "Seal Cove". The naturally themed 500,000-litre pool includes rocky haul out areas and underwater caves along with other environmental enrichment features to ensure the seals are kept in near natural conditions.

In July 2019, the aquarium was renamed the Tynemouth Aquarium.

Hastings

The Hastings branch is located in Hastings, England, which opened on 21 March 2008, formerly being home to Underwater World.

The centrepiece of the aquarium is the coral reef housed within a large ocean display with an underwater walkthrough tunnel.

In January 2021, the Aquarium went under a 12-week remodelling, and reopened in the Spring of 2021 as the Hastings Aquarium.

Bristol

The Bristol branch is located in Bristol, England, and opened in November 2009. It is located at the We the Curious science complex, in the former Wildwalk and IMAX Cinema buildings, which had closed in 2007 due to poor attendance.

The aquarium is home to over 40 living displays from tropical sharks and lobsters to seahorses and tropical fish. At the Aquarium’s heart is a large ocean tank where an underwater walkthrough tunnel offers close encounters with the tropical coral reef fish. Other displays are home to octopus, puffer fish, electric eel, tropical sharks, terrapins and giant Amazon river fish. It is the only aquarium in the UK to feature a giant botanical house home to hundreds of species of plants and flowers from around the world.

The former IMAX space was retained as a cinema, which showcased various wildlife and nature films. However, in November 2011, the aquarium announced they would stop showcasing movies, although the space is still used for venue hire events.

The venue was later renamed the Bristol Aquarium, which it currently operates as.

References

External links

Aquaria in England
Aspro Parks attractions